Mei Li (also called Mei Li's Chinese New Year) is a book by Thomas Handforth.  Released by Doubleday, it was the second recipient of the Caldecott Medal for illustration in 1939. As one of the first American picture books to have an Asian protagonist, it is considered a milestone for diversity in children's fiction.

Plot 
This story is about a girl named Mei Li who ventures out to attend the Chinese New Year festivities with her brother San Yu and is burdened with the task to prove that there are activities for girls, too.

References

American picture books
Caldecott Medal–winning works
1938 children's books
Children's fiction books
Children's books about China
North China in fiction
Chinese New Year children's books